Shorea longisperma (called, along with some other species in the genus Shorea, yellow meranti) is a species of tree in the family Dipterocarpaceae. It is native to Peninsular Thailand, Peninsular Malaysia and Borneo.

References

longisperma
Trees of Thailand
Trees of Peninsular Malaysia
Trees of Borneo
Taxonomy articles created by Polbot